The Sattvata Samhita or Satvata Samhita is a Pancaratra text dealing with the Vyuha Manifestation. Together with the Pauskara-Samhita and the Jayakhya-Samhita, it is considered one of the "Three Gems", the most important samhitas. It was supposedly written around 500 CE, making it one of the oldest Pancaratras.

Notes

External links
https://archive.org/stream/pancaratra-agamas/Sattvata%20Samhita%20-%20Alasinga%20Bhatta%5BSkt%5D#page/n0/mode/1upSanskrit text with commentary by Alasinga Bhatta

Hindu texts